Drive that Fast is a 1991 EP by the UK alternative rock group Kitchens of Distinction. The EP followed the studio album Love Is Hell. The title track later appeared on the full-length album Strange Free World.

Track listing
 "Drive that Fast"
 "These Drinkers"
 "Elephantiny"
 "Three to Beam Up"

Charts

References

1991 EPs
Kitchens of Distinction albums
Shoegaze EPs
Alternative rock EPs